Ivan Klajn (31 January 1937 31 March 2021) was a Serbian linguist, philologist and language historian, with primary interest in Romance languages and Serbian. He was a regular member of the Serbian Academy of Sciences and Arts, and the editor-in-chief of the Matica srpska's journal Jezik danas. Through his paternal family, which lived in Vukovar for generations, he was of Croatian-Jewish descent.

He completed the studies of the Italian language and literature at the University of Belgrade Faculty of Philology. After graduation, he started working at the same faculty, becoming a regular professor of the Italian language and the comparative grammar of Romance languages. Beside Romance Studies, his interest also lies in the language morphology, linguistic consultancy and the standardization of the modern Serbian language. His major works are the Rečnik jezičkih nedoumica ('The dictionary of linguistic dilemmas'), Tvorba reči u savremenom srpskom jeziku ('Morphology in modern Serbian language', 2 volumes) and Italijansko-srpski rečnik ('Italian-Serbian dictionary').

In 2017, he signed the Declaration on the Common Language of the Croats, Serbs, Bosniaks and Montenegrins.

Klajn died from COVID-19 on 31 March 2021, in Belgrade at the age of 84.

Books and articles
In 1974 he started writing weekly columns on the problems of modern Serbo-Croatian, first in Borba, and afterward in Politika and NIN.

He was the editor-in-chief of the linguistic journal Jezik danas ('Language today'), published by Matica srpska. He published a number of papers in linguistic journals, as well as 18 books:

 Ispeci pa reci
 Istorijska gramatika španskog jezika
 Italijansko-srpski rečnik (2 editions)
 Uticaji engleskog jezika u italijanskom (1971)
 Jezik oko nas (1980)
 Lingvističke studije (2000)
 O funkciji i prirodi zamenica (1985)
 Pisci i pismenjaci (1994)
 Razgovori o jeziku (1978)
 Rečnik jezičkih nedoumica (6 editions)
 Rečnik novih reči (1992)
 Stranputice smisla
 Tvorba reči u savremenom srpskom jeziku - Volume I (2002)
 Tvorba reči u savremenom srpskom jeziku - Volume II (2003)

In co-authorship with Pavle Ivić, Mitar Pešikan and Branislav Brborić he wrote Jezički priručnik ('Language manual'), published by Radio Television Belgrade (1991). In the miscellany Srpski jezik na kraju veka ('Serbian language at the end of century') he wrote a part dealing with lexis. His Rečnik jezičkih nedoumica ('The dictionary of language dilemmas') was reprinted in 6 editions. For his Italijansko-srpski rečnik ('Italian-Serbian dictionary', 2nd edition, 2000), he received an award from the Italian government.

Translation
He translated a number of books from Italian and English. His translation of the Giordano Bruno's Il Candelaio ('The Torchbearer'; Serbian: Svećar) was played at the Atelje 212 in Belgrade. He was one of the editors of the Serbian edition of the Cambridge Encyclopedia of Languages (Nolit, Belgrade, 1995), and of the translators of the Serbian edition of the Encyclopedic dictionary of modern linguistics (Nolit, Belgrade, 1988).

Membership
He was a member of the Vukova zadužbina Council ('Vuk's endowment') and the Board for Standardization of the Serbian Language. He was a member and the contributor of Matica srpska.

References

 

1937 births
Writers from Belgrade
Linguists from Serbia
Serbian translators
University of Belgrade Faculty of Philology alumni
Serbian people of Croatian-Jewish descent
Signatories of the Declaration on the Common Language
2021 deaths
Serbian Jews
Deaths from the COVID-19 pandemic in Serbia
Italian–Serbian translators
English–Serbian translators